Anna Sadurska (1924–2004) was a Polish Classical philologist and epigrapher who taught at the University of Warsaw.

Sadurska published the Tomb of the Family of ʻAlainê from ancient Palmyra that was excavated by the Polish archaeological mission in 1969. Sadurska also carried out work on nineteen fragmentary examples of the Tabulae Iliacae, miniature stone carvings from the Roman world that depict scenes from the Trojan War.

Publications
 1964. Les tables iliaques. Warsaw: Państwowe Wydawn.
 1977. Le tombeau de famille de ʻAlainê. Varsovie: PWN-Éditions scientifiques de Pologne.
 Sadurska, A., ʻAdnān Bunnī, and Matḥaf Tadmur. 1994. Les sculptures funéraires de Palmyre. Rome: G. Bretschneider.
 in Propylaeum-DOK

References

1924 births
2004 deaths
20th-century Polish archaeologists
Polish classical philologists
University of Warsaw alumni
Polish women academics
Academic staff of the University of Warsaw
Epigraphers
Polish women archaeologists